Sister Wives is an American reality television series broadcast on TLC. It documents the life of a polygamist family living in Lehi, Utah, which includes patriarch Kody Brown, his four wives and their 18 children. Consisting of nine episodes, the first season premiered with a one-hour debut on September 26, 2010 and ran until November 21, 2010. The series was renewed for a second season, which began in March 2011. The second season continued after a brief hiatus on September 25, 2011. The third season debuted on May 13, 2012, with the fourth-season premiere on July 21, 2013.

Series overview

Episodes

Season 1 (2010)

Season 2 (2011)

Season 3 (2011)

Season 4 (2012)

Season 5 (2012)

Season 6 (2013–2014)

Season 7 (2014)

Season 8 (2015)

Season 9 (2015)

Season 10 (2016)

Season 11 (2016–2017)

Season 12 (2018)

Season 13 (2019)

Season 14 (2020)

Season 15 (2021)

Season 16 (2021–2022)

Season 17 (2022–2023)

References

External links 

Sister Wives
Sister Wives